Nalini Nayak is an activist, feminist and trade unionist based in Kerala, India. She has been involved with coastal communities and their issues for over three decades, associated with Protsahan Trivandrum, Mitraniketan Vagamon and the Self Employed Women's Association.

Work
Nayak is a founder member of the International Collective in Support of Fishworkers, where she has taken the initiative to collectively evolve a feminist perspective in fisheries. She is at present, the general secretary of the Self Employed Women's Association, Kerala, of which she was a joint founder.

Writings and research
 The Coasts, the Fish Resources and the Fishworkers’ Movement by Nalini Nayak and A. J. Vijayan 
 Getting Their Act Together : India: Co-management
 Women in the Ratnagiri Cooperative in Maharashtra, India in ICSF (International Collective in Support of Fishworkers) 
 Professionalising Domestic Services: SEWA Kerala on Labourlife

References

Further reading
Blog on Nalini Nayak - A Woman to respect
NALINI NAYAK'S RESPONSE TO GAIL OMVEDT'S - Showing concerns about larger dams being built on Narmada.
Nalini Nayak was elected to the Ashoka Fellowship in 1990
Interview with Nalini Nayak
 Fishworkers Champion Nalini Nayak Believes One Never Stops Learning Excerpted from 'Memoirs From The Women's Movement In India: Making A Difference', Edited by Ritu Menon; Women Unlimited, 2011/386 pages/Softback;
Fishes and Fisher communities in India - contains links to various documents and resources by Nalini Nayak

Indian women trade unionists
Indian feminists
Trade unionists from Kerala
Living people
Women in Kerala politics
Year of birth missing (living people)